The 62nd Regiment Illinois Volunteer Infantry was an infantry regiment that served in the Union Army during the American Civil War.

Service
The 62nd Illinois Infantry was originally organized  at Anna, Illinois and mustered into Federal service on April 10, 1862.

The regiment was mustered out on March 6, 1866.

Total strength and casualties
The regiment suffered 3 enlisted men who were killed in action or mortally wounded and 9 officers and 251 enlisted men who died of disease, for a total of 263 fatalities.

Commanders
 Colonel James Milton True

See also
List of Illinois Civil War Units
Illinois in the American Civil War

Notes

References
The Civil War Archive

Units and formations of the Union Army from Illinois
1862 establishments in Illinois
Military units and formations established in 1862
Military units and formations disestablished in 1866
1866 disestablishments in Illinois